Irena Brežná (born 26 February 1950) is a Slovak-Swiss writer, journalist and human rights activist writing in German.

Early life and education 
Irena Brežná was born on 26 February 1950, in Bratislava. She grew up in Trenčín. Her parents were repressed by the communist Czechoslovak authorities, her mother spent a year in prison after an unsuccessful attempt to flee to Sweden and her father – a lawyer – was forbidden from working in his professional field. Eventually, her family emigrated in 1968 to Switzerland. In 1975, Brežná began studying Psychology, Philosophy and Slavic studies at University of Basel. She worked as a psychologist and translated from Russian into German.

Career 
During Cold War, Brežná worked as a radio correspondent for the BBC Radio, Deutsche Welle and the Slovak branch of Radio Free Europe. She also actively participated in the works of Amnesty International, focusing on humanitarian and women's rights issues in Guinea and Chechnya. Since the 1980s, she has been a regular contributor to the German and Swiss press, including Die Zeit, Tages-Anzeiger, Neue Zürcher Zeitung, Basler Zeitung and Süddeutsche Zeitung. In the 1990s, she began regularly visiting Slovakia and contributing to a Slovak magazine Aspekt.

Brežná writes in German. In her work, she often deals with the themes of alienation and injustice. She debuted in 1989 with an anti-racist children's book cowritten with Alpha Oumar Barry, titled Biro & Barbara. Her autobiographical work Die Beste aller Welten (2008) placed in Swiss bestseller lists.

Brežná is the recipient of a Swiss Literature Award for her 2012 novel Die undankbare Fremde. She was also awarded the Slovak Dominik Tatarka Award (2016) and Hermann Kesten Prize (2021). Her journalist work has brought her Emma-Journalistinnen-Preis, Theodor Wolff Prize and Zürcher Journalistenpreis. In 2022, she was awarded the Pribina Cross (2nd Class), a Slovak state order.

Brežná lives in Basel.

Publications

References

External links 
 

1950 births
Living people
Slovak emigrants to Switzerland
Writers from Bratislava
21st-century Slovak women writers
20th-century Slovak women writers
Swiss women's rights activists
Slovak women journalists
Swiss women journalists
Swiss writers in German
Recipients of the Pribina Cross